El Molar can refer to:
 El Molar, Madrid, Community of Madrid, Spain
 El Molar, Priorat, Province of Tarragona, Catalonia, Spain

See also
 Los Molares, Seville, Spain
 Molar (disambiguation)